Mannamangalam  is a village in Thrissur district in the state of Kerala, India.

Demographics
 India census, Mannamangalam had a population of 8863 with 4454 males and 4409 females.

References

Villages in Thrissur district